Nitzan Bet is a community settlement in southern Israel.

History
The village was established in 2007 to house former settlers from the Gaza Strip after they were evacuated as part of the disengagement plan.

References

Community settlements
Populated places established in 2007
2007 establishments in Israel
Populated places in Southern District (Israel)